Grenada competed at the 1988 Summer Olympics in Seoul, South Korea.

Competitors
The following is the list of number of competitors in the Games.

Athletics 

Key
Note–Ranks given for track events are within the athlete's heat only
Q = Qualified for the next round
q = Qualified for the next round as a fastest loser or, in field events, by position without achieving the qualifying target
NR = National record
N/A = Round not applicable for the event
Bye = Athlete not required to compete in round

Women
Track & road events
Women's marathon 
 Arlene Vincent Mark — 3:25:32 (→ 62nd place)

Boxing

Grenada sent four boxers to the Olympic boxing tournament.

See also
Grenada at the 1987 Pan American Games

References

Official Olympic Reports
sports-reference

Nations at the 1988 Summer Olympics
1988
Olympics